Eugene O'Brien may refer to:

Eugene O'Brien (actor) (1880–1966), American silent film and stage actor
Eugene O'Brien (composer) (born 1945), American composer, and professor
Eugene O'Brien (engineer) Irish bridge engineer and academic
Eugene O'Brien (playwright), Irish playwright, screenwriter and actor
Eugene O'Brien (politician) (1897–1980), Irish politician
Eugene O'Brien (racing driver) (born 1960), British auto racing driver and coach
Eugene W. O'Brien (1897–1970s), American engineer, editor, and publisher